Adolph Julius Eggers  (January 23, 1859 – 1919) was a Danish composer.

See also
List of Danish composers

References
This article was initially translated from the Danish Wikipedia.

Danish composers
Male composers
1859 births
1919 deaths